The Revolutionary Workers' Party–Unified (Spanish: Partido Obrero Revolucionario-Unificado, POR-U) was a small Trotskyist (left-wing socialist) political party formed in Bolivia in 1984 by the merging of the Revolutionary Workers' Party-Struggle (POR-C) and the Workers' Vanguard Party (VO).

In 1985 POR-U allied with the Revolutionary Liberation Movement Tupaq Katari and its candidate Jenaro Flores Santos.

Notes

1984 establishments in Bolivia
Communist parties in Bolivia
Defunct political parties in Bolivia
Political parties established in 1984
Political parties with year of disestablishment missing
Trotskyist organisations in Bolivia